Rory Elrick is Scottish actor best known for starring as the title character Fletcher Moon in the BBC television series Half Moon Investigations based on the best-selling novel by Eoin Colfer.

Career
He also appeared in Wilbur Wants to Kill Himself, which was directed by Lone Scherfig and written by Lone Scherfig and Anders Thomas Jensen.

Filmography

Television

Film

References

External links

                   

1995 births
Living people
Scottish male child actors
Scottish male television actors
People from West Dunbartonshire